Álex Sala Herrero (born 9 April 2001) is a Spanish footballer who plays as a defensive midfielder for CE Sabadell FC, on loan from Girona FC.

Club career
Born in Viladecans, Barcelona, Catalonia, Sala began his career at UD Viladecans before joining FC Barcelona's La Masia in 2011, aged ten. He left the club in 2014, and subsequently represented UE Cornellà, EF Gavà and CE L'Hospitalet.

Sala made his senior debut with Hospi on 2 September 2018, coming on as a second-half substitute in a 1–0 Tercera División home win over UE Llagostera. The following 16 January, after a further five first team appearances, he returned to Barça and was assigned to the Juvenil A squad.

After finishing his formation, Sala was not registered with Barcelona's B-team for the 2020–21 campaign, and spent six months without playing before terminating his contract with the club on 5 January 2021. He subsequently moved to Girona FC, being initially assigned to the reserves in the fourth division.

Sala made his first team debut with the Blanquivermells on 14 November 2021, replacing Ibrahima Kebe late into a 2–0 home success over FC Cartagena. The following 11 July, he renewed his contract until 2025, being promoted to the first team.

On 29 August 2022, Sala and teammate Pau Víctor were loaned out to Primera Federación side CE Sabadell FC for one year.

References

External links

2001 births
Living people
People from Baix Llobregat
Sportspeople from the Province of Barcelona
Spanish footballers
Footballers from Catalonia
Association football midfielders
Segunda División players
Tercera División players
Tercera Federación players
CE L'Hospitalet players
FC Barcelona Atlètic players
Girona FC B players
Girona FC players
CE Sabadell FC footballers